Taylah Angel (born 15 January 1992) is an Australian rules footballer who played for the Fremantle Football Club in the AFL Women's competition. Angel was drafted by Fremantle with their twelfth selection and ninety-third overall in the 2016 AFL Women's draft. She played the first three matches of the year before being omitted for the round four match against . She missed three matches before returning for the final round match against  to finish with four matches for the year. She was delisted at the end of the 2017 season.

References

External links 

1992 births
Living people
Fremantle Football Club (AFLW) players
Australian rules footballers from Western Australia
Indigenous Australian players of Australian rules football